William Bernard Kaus (24 May 1923 – 20 December 2006) was a businessman and member of the Queensland Legislative Assembly.

Biography
Kaus was born at Kangaroo Point, Queensland, to parents William Rahman Kaus and his wife Doreen May (née Baker). He was involved in the family business, Kaus Bros Bedding Manufacturers.

In World War II he joined the Royal Australian Air Force and was assigned as a Flying officer to the 161 Squadron. He was awarded the Distinguished Flying Cross and France's highest honour, the Legion of Honour in 2005.

On 12 June 1948 Kaus married Neth Florette Hutchinson and together had two sons and two daughters (one of whom was the federal MP Andrea West). He died in December 2006 in Brisbane and was cremated at the Mt Thompson Crematorium.

Public career
Kaus, for the Liberal Party, won the seat of Hawthorne at the 1966 Queensland state election. He was the member for Hawthorne until it was abolished before the 1972 state election. Kaus then represented the seat of Mansfield from 1972 until 1986 state election. In 1983, he switch parties and joined the National Party after losing preselection by the Liberals.

Kaus had many roles in Parliament and his party including:
 Member, Government Party Committees: Treasury; Local Government, Main Roads and Racing; Transport; Tourism, National Parks, Sport and the Arts
 Secretary of the Hawthorne Branch of the Liberal Party, 1966
 Secretary of the Parliamentary Liberal Party, 1967 – 1980
 Member of the Government Party Committees: Justice; Health; Tourism; Transport, 1969 – 1972
 Member of the Government Party Committees: Health; Tourism, Sport and Welfare; Transport, 1972 – 1974
 Member of the Government Party Committees: Community and Welfare Services, Sport; Transport; Local Government and Main Roads; Tourism and Marine Services; Health, 1975 – 1977
 Member of the Government Party Committees: Local Government and Main Roads; Culture, National Parks and Recreation; Transport; Works and Housing, 1978 – 1980
 Member of the Government Party Committees: Commerce and Industry; Employment and Labour Relations; Local Government, Main Roads and Police; Tourism, National Parks, Sport and the Arts, 1981 – 1983
 Deputy Government Whip 
 Temporary Chairman of Committees from 1975 until 1983
 Delegate to the 28th Commonwealth Parliamentary Association Conference, The Bahamas 
 Alternate Delegate to the Australian Constitutional Convention in 1985

Kaus was a keen sportsman, especially in cricket, football, shooting and bowls. He was an inaugural Member of the Queensland Cricketers Club and President of the Queensland Rifle Association. He was also responsible for the introduction of yellow rain coats for schoolchildren and the Lollipop Road Safety personnel.

References

Members of the Queensland Legislative Assembly
1923 births
2006 deaths
Liberal Party of Australia members of the Parliament of Queensland
National Party of Australia members of the Parliament of Queensland
20th-century Australian politicians
Royal Australian Air Force personnel of World War II
Royal Australian Air Force officers
Recipients of the Distinguished Flying Cross (United Kingdom)
Recipients of the Legion of Honour